"Son Song" is a song, played as the sixth track of the Soulfly album Primitive. Roadrunner Records released this song in the form of single in 2001, but the album containing this song was released a year before. It is the sixth single released by Soulfly and second from Primitive.

Song proposal 
This Soulfly song was proposed when Max Cavalera met Sean Lennon in 1999 during Big Day Out festival in Australia. Max said that Gloria Cavalera, Max's wife, suggested him to form duet with Sean to sing song. 

She thought it would be cool if we sang together; [that] both voices would be amazing. I called Sean, and he was into it. We spent four days on that song; he came to my house, we scribbled around a little bit with the acoustic guitar, then we wrote the lyrics. We took more time on that song, and took it to the studio, and saw the whole thing really come to life, from scratch.

Max said that collaborating with Sean was not necessarily expected by fans, but he is kind enough due to his unique speech.

Lyrics and tribute 
In this song, co-writers Max Cavalera and Sean Lennon sing about everything turning to dust by screaming at the sky or looking at the sun. Before the song begins, Sean counts to four as first line of lyrics, and then sings the first verse after the song begins. Max sings the choruses starting with 'Dust myself up' while Sean sings the verses containing 'Every moment is precious'.

Despite the song title, the lyrics don't contain 'Son Song', but so-named because it involves sons paying tribute to their deceased fathers by writing and singing the song together. Sean's father, John Lennon, one of the world's most famous singers and songwriters, was murdered at age 40, while Max prays for his father, who died of a heart attack also at age 40 while Max was 9.

Composition 
"Son Song" lasts 4:17, but the single version lasts 23 seconds shorter. The first 2½ minutes of this song plays grungy metal riff, with all of the lyrics being sung in this part, and then to mostly vocalless world music part with synthesizers and keyboards, except when Sean talking to Max about how he hurt his fingertip by plucking heavy-gauge guitar strings. Berimbau is playing during the final 11 seconds of the song. The intro and verses are written in  time signature. This may be influenced by a progressive metal oriented sound.

This Soulfly song is noted for having elements similar to Alice in Chains songs due to Sean's similar vocals to Layne Staley, thus with influences of grunge.

Appearance in the film 
"Son Song" appears on the Valentine soundtrack as track No. 14, but the only one of 18 songs listed on the track that can't be heard in the film.

Track listing

US promo CD

UK promo CD

Personnel 
Soulfly
 Max Cavalera – vocals, rhythm guitar
 Marcelo "Cello" Dias – bass, percussion, drums on "In Memory Of..."
 Mikey Doling – lead guitar
 Joe Nunez – drums
Additional personnel
 Sean Lennon – vocals, guitar, piano, synthesizer and production on "Son Song"
 Babatunde Rabouin – vocals on "In Memory Of..."
 Deonte Perry – vocals on "In Memory Of...", additional drum programming on "Son Song" and "In Memory Of..."
 Justus Olbert – vocals on "In Memory Of..."
 Larry McDonald – percussion
 Meia Noite – percussion
 Max Cavalera – production
 Toby Wright – keyboards and drum programming on "In Memory Of...", production
 Andy Wallace – mixing
 George Marino – mastering

References 

Soulfly songs
2001 singles
Songs written by Max Cavalera
2000 songs
Roadrunner Records singles
Progressive metal songs